Nicholas Mills Donaldson (November 12, 1809February 7, 1879) was an American lawyer, judge, and pioneer of Wisconsin and Minnesota.  He was a member of the Wisconsin State Assembly for three terms, representing , and served fourteen years as a Minnesota district court judge.  He was also the 10th mayor of Owatonna, Minnesota, and the first prosecuting attorney of Ashland County, Ohio.

Biography
Nicholas Donaldson was born in Cambridge, New York, in Washington County, in November 1809.  He was raised and educated on his father's farm until he went to work as a clerk in the town of Argyle, New York, at age 18.  He then completed his education at the Salem Academy.  After graduating, he worked summers as a farmhand and taught school in the winters.  

In 1840, he moved west to the Hayesville, Ohio.  He continued to teach school in Ohio while studying law under attorney Thomas W. Bartley—later a justice of the Ohio Supreme Court and the 17th governor of Ohio.  He was admitted to the bar in 1843 and opened a law office in Mansfield, Ohio.  When Ashland County, Ohio, was created, he moved to Loudonville, Ohio, and was elected the first prosecuting attorney for the county.

He moved to Wisconsin in 1849, and settled at Waupun, in Fond du Lac County.  He was elected to the Fond du Lac County Board of Supervisors for four terms in the 1850s, and was chairman for 1853 and 1856.  In addition, he was a founder and first president of the Fond du Lac Fire Insurance Company, and worked as deputy warden at the Waupun State Prison. 

He was a member of the Whig Party, and was elected to three consecutive terms in the Wisconsin State Assembly, representing three different Fond du Lac County Assembly districts from 1852 through 1854.  He became a member of the Republican Party after that party was organized in 1854.

In the Fall of 1856, Donaldson left Wisconsin and relocated to Owatonna in the Minnesota Territory.  Concurrent with the referendum to adopt the Minnesota Constitution in October 1857, he was elected Minnesota district court judge for the 5th judicial district.  He was re-elected in 1864, serving through the end of 1871.  After retiring from the judiciary, he served as a city justice, city alderman, and was elected mayor of Owatonna in 1876. 

He died at his home in Owatonna on February 7, 1879, after an illness of several days.

References

External links
 

|-

|-

1809 births
1879 deaths
People from Washington County, New York
People from Loudonville, Ohio
People from Fond du Lac County, Wisconsin
People from Waupun, Wisconsin
People from Owatonna, Minnesota
Wisconsin lawyers
Wisconsin Whigs
Wisconsin Republicans
Minnesota Republicans
County supervisors in Wisconsin
Members of the Wisconsin State Assembly
Mayors of places in Minnesota
Minnesota state court judges
19th-century American politicians